David J. Robinson is a former member of the Ohio House of Representatives. He was appointed to his position when the previous representative, E. J. Thomas, resigned; in turn, when Robinson lost the Republican primary election to Jim Hughes, he resigned so that Hughes could be appointed to his seat and run as an incumbent.

While in office, Robinson was the sponsor of noise-reduction legislation for trains.

References

Republican Party members of the Ohio House of Representatives
Ohio lawyers
Living people
Year of birth missing (living people)